Mary Upton (born 30 May 1946) is a former Irish Labour Party politician. She served as a Teachta Dála (TD) for the Dublin South-Central constituency from 1999 to 2011.

Upton was born in Kilrush, County Clare and was educated at Coláiste Mhuire, Ennis; University College Galway and University College Dublin. She worked as a university lecturer before entering into full-time politics.

Upton was first elected to Dáil Éireann at the Dublin South-Central by-election on 28 October 1999, caused by the death of her brother, Pat Upton. She was re-elected at the 2002 and 2007 general elections. She served as party spokesperson on Agriculture and Food; and Arts, Sport and Tourism.

She retired from politics at the 2011 general election.

References

External links
 "Dr Mary Upton" - interview with Yvonne Healy of The Irish Times following election to the Dáil
 

1946 births
Living people
Academics of University College Dublin
Alumni of the University of Galway
Alumni of University College Dublin
Labour Party (Ireland) TDs
Members of the 28th Dáil
Members of the 29th Dáil
Members of the 30th Dáil
20th-century women Teachtaí Dála
21st-century women Teachtaí Dála
People from Kilrush
Politicians from County Clare